The Alberta Real Estate Association (AREA) represents 10,000+ real estate brokers and associates who are members of Alberta's 10 real estate boards.

History
 1947 - AREA founded
 1996 - Real Estate Council of Alberta established, transferring regulatory control from Alberta Municipal Affairs.  AREA appoints six industry members to Council

See also
 Canadian Real Estate Association
 Realtors Association of Edmonton
 Multiple Listing Service

External links
 Alberta Real Estate Association

References

Real estate industry trade groups based in Canada